Bocchoris trimaculalis is a moth in the family Crambidae. It was described by Snellen in 1880. It is found on India, Burma, and Sulawesi.

References

Moths described in 1880
Spilomelinae